Elections for all seats on Forest of Dean District Council were held on 7 May 2015 as part of the 2015 United Kingdom local elections. No party gained overall control.

The Conservatives remained the largest party on the council, having increased their number of Councillors, but failing to gain an overall majority. This election saw the Green Party gain their first seats on the council, while the Liberal Democrats lost their only Councillor.

Ward results

Alvington, Aylburton & West Lydney

Awre

Berry Hill

Blaisdon and Longhope

Bream

Bromsberrow & Dymock

Christchurch and English Bicknor

Note: During the 2011 elections, this ward was only contested by the Conservatives, who were elected unopposed.

Churcham and Huntley

Cinderford East

Cinderford West

Coleford Central

Coleford East

Hartpury

Hewelsfield and Woolaston

Littledean & Ruspidge

Lydbrook & Ruardean

Lydney East

Lydney North

Mitcheldean & Drybrook

Newent Central

Newland and St Briavels

Newnham & Westbury

Oxenhall and Newent North East

Pillowell

Redmarley

Tibberton

Tidenham

References

2015 English local elections
May 2015 events in the United Kingdom
2015
2010s in Gloucestershire